Kumarli is a town located in Tehran, Iran.

References

Populated places in Tehran Province